Kenneth "K-Fam" Fambro  is an American songwriter, producer, and multi-instrumentalist best known for producing and co-writing for Boyz II Men, Destiny's Child, and Robyn, among others. Fambro, a pianist and drummer by ear, was an early protégé of Antonio "LA Reid" Reid, who brought him to LaFace Records / Arista Records where he worked alongside production outfit Organized Noize. This label collaboration resulted in placements on Boyz II Men's Full Circle project, as well as 112.

Songwriting, instrumental and production credits

Credits are courtesy of Discogs, Tidal, Apple Music, and AllMusic.

Guest appearances

References 

African-American songwriters
American hip hop record producers
African-American record producers
Year of birth missing (living people)
Living people